The Yemisi Shyllon Museum of Art is a contemporary art museum in Ibeju-Lekki, Lagos State, Nigeria.

History 
The idea with the creation of the museum was by the Yoruba prince of Abeokuta, Yemisi Shyllon, who collected 55,000 photographs and 7,000 artworks, Shyllon's collection contains works by Nigerian artists, but also contains works of art by artists from other African countries such as Ghana, Senegal, South Africa, Cameroon and Togo. The museum was designed by Spanish-Nigerian architect Jesse Castellote, which contains about 1,2000 artworks that were mainly donated by Shyllon. The museum's first two exhibits were about Nigerian art. This is Nigeria's first privately funded university museum. In September 2014, Yemisi Shyllon presented the idea for the creation of the museum at Pan-Atlantic University. In June 2015, Yemisi Shyllon made several donations for the construction of the museum. Construction of the museum began in 2018. The museum was inaugurated in October 2019. In November 2020, the museum won the Apollo Award for Opening of the Year Award. In May 2021, the museum will join the MuseumFutures Africa project, a project aimed at developing museums on the African continent. Since October 2021, the museum has been part of the Google Arts & Culture platform. In collaboration with Google, 150 artifacts from the museum were digitized, plus a virtual tour was added with an adapted version of Google Street View.

Gallery

Collections 
The museum contains works of art from different West African artists such as El Anatsui, Uche Okeke and Bruce Onobrakpeya. The museum contains a collection of historical sculptures. The museum contains artwork dating from the pre-colonial period to the present. The museum contains Nok terracotta found in Igbo-Ukwu and North Central Nigeria, plus exhibits on Ife art and Benin art. The museum contains traditional African wooden sculptures by Yoruba artist Lamidi Olonade Fakeye. In addition, the museum contains artworks by artists Ben Enwonwu, Peju Alatise, Victor Ehikhamenor, Akinola Lasekan and Aina Onabolu. The museum contains a bronze sculpture of an Ife head. The museum contains photographs of different cultural festivals in Nigeria, most of these photographs were produced by Ariyo Oguntimehin. In addition, the museum has sculptures by Isiaka Osunde, Oladapo Afolayan, Adeola Balogun and Okpu Eze. The museum also has a collection of wood carvings. The museum contains a collection of Afikpo masks, which are traditional masks made of wood used by the Afikpo people, an ethnic group of Ebonyi State.  In August 2021, the museum presented an exhibition called "The Invincible Hands", which is intended to celebrate the artistic contributions of Nigerian women artists, featuring artworks by Nmadinachi Egwim, Ayobola Kekere-Ekun, Damilola Tejuoso, Winifred Ukpong, Chidinma Nnoli, Fati Abubakar, Joy Labinjo, Abigail Nnaji, Lucy Azubuike, Taiye Idahor and Olawunmi Banjo. The museum contains a section dedicated to members of the Oshogbo School of Art, featuring works by Muraino Oyelami, Susanne Wenger, Rufus Ogundele and Nike Davies-Okundaye. The museum also contains Ifa Divination Trays. The museum has among its collections treasures dating from the 16th century from the kingdom of Benin, also the museum has a royal figurine dating from the 14th century belonging to the kingdom of Ife.

External links 

 Twitter
 Facebook

References 

Museums in Nigeria
Art museums and galleries in Nigeria
Buildings and structures in Lagos State
2019 establishments in Nigeria
Pan-Atlantic University